The Carl Sagan Award for Public Understanding of Science is an award presented by the Council of Scientific Society Presidents  (CSSP) to individuals who have become “concurrently accomplished as researchers and/or educators, and as widely recognized magnifiers of the public's understanding of science.” The award was first presented in 1993 to astronomer, Carl Sagan (1934–1996), who is also the award's namesake.

Winners
1993: Carl Sagan, Laboratory for Planetary Studies, Cornell University
1994: E. O. Wilson, Curator, Museum of Comparative Zoology, Harvard University
1995: National Geographic Society and National Geographic Magazine: Gilbert Hovey Grosvenor and William Allen
1996: PBS Nova and Paula Apsell
1997: Bill Nye, Bill Nye the Science Guy
1998: Alan Alda, John Angier, Graham Chedd, PBS Scientific American Frontiers
1999: Richard Harris; Ira Flatow, National Public Radio
2000: John Rennie, Scientific American
2001: John Noble Wilford, "Science Times" of the New York Times
2002: Philip G. Zimbardo, PBS Discovering Psychology
2003: Island Press
2004: Popular Science
2005: Cheryl Heuton and Nicolas Falacci, creators of Numb3rs
2006: Court TV
2007: Kenneth R. Weiss and Usha Lee McFarling, Los Angeles Times
2009: Thomas Friedman, The New York Times
2010: Sylvia Earle, National Geographic Society
2013: Bassam Shakhashiri, American Chemical Society
2017: Charles Bolden, Former Administrator – National Aeronautics and Space Administration
2018: Steven Pinker
2019: William S. Hammack

References

External links
Carl Sagan Award for Public Understanding of Science
 Carl Sagan Award for Public Appreciation of Science

Science communication awards
Carl Sagan